Room for Improvement is the debut mixtape from Canadian rapper Drake. It was self-released in 2006. The mixtape was originally intended for sale only and had sold 6,000 copies in 2006.

Background
In an interview with thabiz.com in February 2006, Drake talked about the mixtape, "It's a mix CD and I did it with DJ Smallz who does the Southern Smoke Series. He's done mixtapes with everyone. Lil Wayne, Young Jeezy, a lot of people and he's hosting it for me. It's called Room for Improvement. It's seventeen original tracks and a couple of remixes and stuff like that. 22 tracks in total. I have the Clipse on there, I got Trey Songz in there, I got Lupe Fiasco on there, I have Nickelus F who is this amazing artist from Virginia who I'm very very tight with and we work together a lot, we worked together. I have Voyce on there, he's a singer from Toronto. Production wise I don't really have any major producers on there. I have a song I did with Trey Songz. I have an individual by the name of Nick Rashur from Harlem he's a really cool cat. Amir; Boi-1da did the majority of the singles, who else should I mention DJ Ra from DC, a lot of people on the CD."

The mixtape was re-released in 2009 featuring only 11 selected songs with no DJs along with a remix of 'Do What You Do'.

Track listing
Partial credits adapted from Drake's personal notebook.

Notes
 "Pianist Hands" features vocals from Mazin's dad
 "Make Things Right" features vocals from Byram Joseph

Personnel
Partial credits adapted from Drake's personal notebook.

Musicians
 Al-Khaaliq – piano

References

Drake (musician) albums
2006 mixtape albums
Debut mixtape albums
2006 compilation albums
Albums produced by Boi-1da
Albums produced by Frank Dukes